The Thorns is an American sitcom that aired from January 15 until March 11, 1988.

Premise
The Thorns are a dysfunctional married couple trying to climb their way up the social ladder in New York while dealing with their children and a grandmother moving in.

Cast
Tony Roberts as Sloan Thorn
Kelly Bishop as Ginger Thorn
Marilyn Cooper as Rose Thorn
Lori Petty as Cricket
Mary Louise Wilson as Toinette
Adam Biesk as Chad Thorn
Jesse Tendler as Edmund Thorn
Maureen Stapleton as Mrs. Hamilton
Kathreen Marcopulos as Katina Pappas
Lisa Rieffel as Joey Thorn

Episodes

References

External links

1988 American television series debuts
1988 American television series endings
1980s American sitcoms
Television series about dysfunctional families
English-language television shows
American Broadcasting Company original programming
Television shows set in New York City